The CS 395 is a Canadian sailboat, that was designed by Germán Frers and first built in 1979.

Production
The boat was built by CS Yachts in Canada, but is now out of production.

Design
The CS 395 is a small recreational keelboat, built predominantly of fibreglass. It has a masthead sloop rig, a skeg-mounted rudder and a fixed fin keel. It displaces  and carries  of ballast.

See also
List of sailing boat types

Similar sailboats
C&C 115

References

Keelboats
1970s sailboat type designs
Sailing yachts
Sailboat type designs by Germán Frers
Sailboat types built by CS Yachts